Med Jones (a.k.a. Med Yones) is an American economist. He is the president of International Institute of Management, a U.S. based research organization. His work at the institute focuses on economic, investment, and business strategies.

Career

The Great Recession of 2008

Med Jones is one of few economists who predicted the Great Recession of 2008 caused by the burst of the United States housing bubble, the Subprime mortgage crisis and the financial crisis of 2007–2008. In a 2006 white paper, he listed three major U.S. economic risks for the decade between 2007 and 2017. The risks included the housing bubble and consumer debt, among the main risks to the US economy. In March 2007, in a Reuters' Interview, he, again, said the impact of the subprime mortgages will not be limited to the housing sector, he warned about increased bankruptcies, stock market crash,  and a loss of the confidence in the US economy. According to Reuters, “He said the bursting of the real estate bubble and high consumer debt were a major worry" and “if people started to think there may be a lot of bankruptcies (in the subprime lending market), then you’re going to see the stock market sell-off.” More importantly, he explicitly warned about a much worse economic crisis as a result of the subprime mortgages, stating that “The worst thing that could happen to any economy is the loss of confidence”.

In 2007 the Federal Reserve was still blind to the impact of the housing bubble and subprime crash. In August 2007, the New York Federal Reserve reported that for the most part, Bear Stearns' (mortgage-related financial) problems did not pose a substantial risk to the economy. The Fed Chairman stated that: "The housing market has looked a bit more solid, and the worst outcomes have been made less likely".  In May 2008. In a congressional testimony, the Fed Chairman Ben Bernanke said he saw only a "limited" impact of subprimes on "the broader housing market."

In 2009, top economists and some Nobel laureates in Economics, came under criticism for defending their failure to see the crisis, stating that the economic crisis was unpredictable. According to Wharton University, "What made it worse is that not only the top economists failed to predict it, they positively denied that it will happen."

Economic forecasting is the holy grail of investing. Wall Street spends billions of dollars on economic research and analysis. Accurate economic forecasting is regarded by academics and investors to be next to impossible. Yet, sometimes some analysts emerge with a specific view that contradicts the mainstream and with exceptional accuracy they prove the most respected economists and investors wrong. Among the economists who predicted the crisis, Jones' predictions are considered the most accurate.

In 2010, President Barack Obama Administration and mainstream economists at leading think tanks, were focused on finding ways to restore"economic confidence".

In 2015, seven years after the Great Recession, academic researchers presented a paper at the World Economic Forum explaining that economic confidence was not fully taken into consideration in academia and it was a major factor for recovery from great recession.

Investors and investment advisers who follow Jones' predictions regard him among the prominent independent thinking money managers and economists.

Views on economic forecasting and Wall Street 

Despite having the most accurate forecasting record of the great recession and recovery, he advises investors against using his own forecasts. Jones believes economic forecasting is unreliable and Wall Street is a casino. In one interview, he says "I do not advise anyone to invest based on my outlook of the economy. The truth is that when people invest on Wall Street, they are essentially making bets about the future.” In addition, although he is known for his work on economics, he tries to distance himself from the economic profession.

Gross National Happiness Index - GNH Index

Mr. Jones is credited with the introduction of the first Gross National Happiness Index (GNH Index) in 2005, also known as Gross National Well-being Index (GNW Index).

In 2006, he published a white paper titled the American Pursuit of Unhappiness calling on policymakers, economists and researchers implement the first GNH Index framework. The initiative was widely referenced by academic and research papers citing the GNH index as a model for economic development and measurement.

The term Gross National Happiness (GNH) was coined in 1972 by Sicco Mansholt one of the Founding Fathers of the European Union and the fourth president of the European Commission. GNH is often misattributed to Bhutan's fourth King, Jigme Singye Wangchuck who popularized the concept in the late 1990s. The GNH philosophy suggested that the ideal purpose of governments is to promote happiness. The philosophy remained difficult to implement due to the subjective nature of happiness and the lack of exact quantitative definition of GNH  and the lack of a practical model to measure the impact of economic policies on the subjective well-being of the citizens.

The purpose of the GNH Index was to create a new metric as an alternative to the traditional GDP indicator, the new metric would integrates subjective and objective socioeconomic development policy framework and measurement indicators. The GNH Index was designed to transform the first generation abstract subjective political mission statement into a second generation implementation holistic (objective and subjective) concept and by treating happiness as a socioeconomic development metric. The proposed metric measures socioeconomic development by tracking seven wellness development areas: economic, environmental, physical, mental, workplace, social, and political via objective data and subjective results via survey. GNH value is proposed to be an index function of the total average per capita. In the same year, he published a global GNH Index survey blueprint that can benchmark the subjective well-being in different countries, correlate happiness levels with differences in local policies to help identify best practices and major socioeconomic policy issues. The first Global Gross National Happiness Index Survey was launched in 2005.

After the introduction of GNH index initiative in 2005, several initiatives were launched that adapted the gross national happiness index to their community.

In a report (2012) prepared for the US Congressman Hansen Clarke, R, Researchers Ben, Beachy and Juston Zorn, at John F. Kennedy School of Government in Harvard University, recommended that "the Congress should prescribe the broad parameters of new, carefully designed supplemental national indicators; it should launch a bipartisan commission of experts to address unresolved methodological issues, and include alternative indicators." They proposed that the government can use the survey results to see which well-being dimensions are least satisfied and which districts and demographic groups are most deficient, so as to allocate resources accordingly. The report list the Gross National Happiness Index and its seven measurement area as one of the main frameworks to consider.

In 2007 Thailand releases the Green and Happiness Index (GHI).

In 2009, in the United States, the Gallup poll system launched the happiness survey and collected data on a national scale. The Gallup Well-Being Index was modelled after the GNH Index framework of 2005. The Well-Being Index score is an average of six sub-indexes that measures life evaluation, emotional health, work environment, physical health, healthy behaviours, and access to basic necessities. In October 2009, the USA scored 66.1/100.

In 2010 the Bhutan GNH Index was conducted for the first time, the Bhutan GNH Index is similar to the first GNH Index created by Med Jones.

In 2011 UN General Assembly Resolution 65/309, titled "Happiness: towards a holistic approach to development".

In 2011 Organization for Economic Co-operation and Development (OECD) launches "Better Life Index" (BLI).

In 2011 Canadian Index of Wellbeing Network (CIW Network)  releases The Canadian Index of Wellbeing (CIW).

In 2011, a leading Israeli newspaper, Haaretz, published an article suggesting that western GDP economics is an incomplete development model and called for the adoption of Bhutan's GNH philosophy and Jones' GNH Index in Israel.

In 2012, the city of Seattle in Washington, launched its own happiness index initiative, emphasizing measures similar to the GNH Index.

In 2012 South Korea Launched Happiness Index citing the GNH Index framework.

In India, Government of Goa 2030 Vision and Roadmap in (2012) cited the GNH Index as a model for measuring happiness.

In 2014 The government of Dubai launched its localized Happiness Index to measure the public's contentment and satisfaction with different government services.

In 2014 the United Kingdom launched its own well-being and happiness  statistics.

In 2012 Professor Peter T. Coleman, a world-renowned director of the International Center for Cooperation and Conflict Resolution at Columbia University, suggested that Jones' GNH Index initiative could inform the Global Peace Index Initiative GPI.

Other noteworthy Happiness Index initiatives that followed the GNH Index of 2005 are the Organization for Economic Co-operation and Development OECD Better Life Index in 2011, World Happiness Report in 2011 and the Social Progress Index SPI in 2013.

Political views 
Med Jones is identified as an independent in his profile on Wall Street Economists.

References

External links
 Bio page on the International Institute of Management Think Tank
  Happiness Economics Work Citations
 Financial Crisis Work Citations 
 Organizational Leadership Work Citations 
 

Living people
American economics writers
International finance economists
Macroeconomists
Public economists
American development economists
20th-century American economists
21st-century American economists
American financial commentators
American finance and investment writers
American male non-fiction writers
Writers about globalization
American political commentators
American political writers
American investors
American business writers
21st-century American businesspeople
American business theorists
American management consultants
Business speakers
Year of birth missing (living people)
20th-century American male writers
21st-century American male writers